Macrobrachium assamense is a species of freshwater shrimp that was first described in 1958. M. assamense is light brown to dark brown and found in Asia.

References

Palaemonidae
Freshwater crustaceans of Asia
Crustaceans described in 1958